Galo B. Ocampo (October 16, 1913 – September 12, 1985) was a Philippine artist. He was also the first Filipino to study heraldry and was a member of the International Institute of Genealogy and Heraldry in Madrid.

Ocampo was born in Santa Rita, Pampanga. In 1929, he studied Fine Arts at the University of the Philippines in Manila.

A modernist painter, he painted works such as the "Moro Dancer" and the "Igorot Dance". Among his paintings, the "Brown Madonna" garnered attention in 1938 because of its depiction of Jesus and Mary as non-Caucasian, brown Filipinos; It was also said to be "flat and two-dimensional". He, along with Victorio C. Edades and Carlos V. Francisco, painted the mural "Rising Philippines" in the lobby of the Capitol Theater in Manila.

He served as the director of the National Museum from 1962 to 1968 and also served as a Secretary of the now-defunct Philippine Heraldry Committee which helped to design various seals of the different cities, municipalities, and provinces of the Philippines. After the Reorganization Act of 1972, the committee was abolished (its responsibilities were to be later handled by the National Historical Institute) and Ocampo became the Technical Adviser on Heraldry of the Office of the President.

Among his many works are the stained glass windows in the reconstructed Manila Cathedral and those in the Santo Domingo Church in Quezon City. His most prominent work in heraldry include the Coat of arms of the Philippines, the seal of the president, the different coat of arms of the different Archbishops of Manila and the various symbols of state of the Philippines. He designed the insignia of the Order of the Golden Heart among others.

In 2015, he was posthumously awarded the Order of Lakandula with the rank of Marangal na Pinuno for his services to art and heraldry.

References

External links
 Symbols of The State 
 Mysteries and Colors: Galo Ocampo
 Looking Back: Brown Madonna
 CNN ireport: Exploring Three Centuries of Philippine Art
 A Brush with Greatness

1913 births
1985 deaths
Filipino painters
Modernists
Heraldists
Artists from Pampanga
University of the Philippines Manila alumni
Recipients of the Order of Lakandula